The 1998–99 Honduran Segunda División was the 32nd season of the Honduran Segunda División.  Under the management of Miguel Escalante, C.D. Federal won the tournament after defeating C.D. Melgar in the final series and obtained promotion to the 1999–2000 Honduran Liga Nacional.

Regular season

Standings
 Group North

 Group South

Postseason

Final

 Federal 2–2 Melgar on aggregated.  Federal won 7–6 on penalty shoot-outs

References

Segunda
1998